The Whispering Skull may refer to:

 The Whispering Skull (film), 1944 film
 The Whispering Skull (novel), by Jonathan Stroud